The 1999–2000 North West Counties Football League season was the 18th in the history of the North West Counties Football League, a football competition in England. Teams were divided into two divisions; Division One and Division Two.

Division One 

Division One featured three new teams:

 Abbey Hey, promoted as runners-up of Division Two
 Great Harwood Town, relegated from the NPL Division One
 Fleetwood Freeport, promoted as champions of Division Two

League table

Division Two 

Division Two featured two new teams:

 Alsager, promoted as runners-up of the Midland Football League
 Holker Old Boys, relegated from Division One

League table

References

 http://www.tonykempster.co.uk/archive99-00/nwc1.htm
 http://www.tonykempster.co.uk/archive99-00/nwc2.htm

External links 
 NWCFL Official Site

North West Counties Football League seasons
8